Erika Burkart (8 February 1922, Aarau – 14 April 2010) was a Swiss writer and poet. She was the recipient of many awards, among them the Conrad-Ferdinand-Meyer-Preis, the Gottfried-Keller-Preis, the Joseph-Breitbach-Preis, and the Wolfgang-Amadeus-Mozart-Preis.

She was born in Aarau in 1922. Erika Burkart's literary estate is archived in the Swiss Literary Archives in Bern.

Died in Muri in 2010.

Works

Poetry books
 Der dunkle Vogel, Tschudy Verlag, St. Gallen 1953
 Sterngefährten, Tschudy Verlag, St. Gallen 1955
 Bann und Flug, Tschudy Verlag, St. Gallen 1956
 Geist der Fluren, Tschudy Verlag, St. Gallen 1958
 Die gerettete Erde, Tschudy Verlag, St. Gallen 1960
 Mit den Augen der Kore, Tschudy Verlag, St. Gallen 1962
 Ich lebe, Artemis Verlag, Zurich 1964
 Die weichenden Ufer, Artemis Verlag, Zurich 1967
 Fernkristall. Ausgewählte Gedichte, Verlag an der Hartnau, Tobel (TG) 1972
 Die Transparenz der Scherben, Benziger Verlag, Zurich 1973
 Das Licht im Kahlschlag, Artemis Verlag, Zurich 1977
 Augenzeuge. Ausgewählte Gedichte, Artemis Verlag, Zurich 1978
 Die Freiheit der Nacht, Artemis Verlag, Zurich 1981
 Sternbild des Kindes, Artemis Verlag, Zurich 1984
 Schweigeminute, Artemis Verlag, Zurich 1988
 Ich suche den blauen Mohn, Pflanzengedichte (Blumenbilder Max Löw), GS-Verlag, Basel 1989
 Die Zärtlichkeit der Schatten, Ammann Verlag, Zurich 1991
 Stille fernster Rückruf, Ammann Verlag, Zurich 1997
 Langsamer Satz, Ammann Verlag, Zurich 2002
 Ortlose Nähe, Ammann Verlag, Zurich 2005
 Geheimbrief, Ammann Verlag, Zurich 2009
 Das späte Erkennen der Zeichen, Weissbooks.w Verlag, Frankfurt am Main 2010
 Nachtschicht / Schattenzone, Weissbooks.w Verlag, Frankfurt am Main 2011, together with Ernst Halter

English translation
 Nightshift / An Area of Shadows (Spuyten Duyvil, 2013), translated by Marc Vincenz, 
 A Late Recognition of the Signs (Spuyten Duyvil, 2016), translated by Marc Vincenz,

Prose works
 Moräne, novel, Walter Verlag, Olten 1970
 Jemand entfernt sich, stories, Benziger Verlag, Zürich 1972
 Rufweite, Artemis Verlag, Zürich 1975
 Der Weg zu den Schafen, novel, Artemis Verlag, Zürich 1979
 Die Spiele der Erkenntnis, Artemis Verlag, Zürich 1985
 Das Schimmern der Flügel, Ammann Verlag, Zürich 1994
 Grundwasserstrom . Aufzeichnungen, Ammann Verlag, Zürich 2000 
 Die Vikarin, Ammann Verlag, Zürich 2006

References
Obituary

External links 
 Literary estate of Erika Burkart in the archive database HelveticArchives of the Swiss National Library.
Publications by and about Erika Burkart in the catalogue Helveticat of the Swiss National Library.
 
 "Fragments, Shards, and Visions," translations by Marc Vincenz & Andrea Scrima. Hyperion: On the Future of Aesthetics, Vol VII, No 1 (2013).

1922 births
2010 deaths
People from Aarau
Swiss poets in German
20th-century Swiss poets
Swiss women poets
20th-century women writers